Janaki Kalaganaledu is an Indian Telugu-language television drama series airing on Star Maa from 22 March 2021. It is the remake of the StarPlus' Hindi soap opera Diya Aur Baati Hum. It stars Priyanka Jain and Amardeep Chowdhary.

Plot
The story is set in Atreyapuram. The educated and ambitious Janaki dreams of becoming an IPS and her father Shiva Prasad supports her dreams. Ramachandra (Rama) is a young, partially educated Confectioner from a middle-class traditional family. His mother Jnanamba is on a search of his bride whom she wants to be partially educated, responsible and an ideal housewife. Janaki's dreams are destroyed after her parents die in a boat accident due to a cyclone while Rama's marriage is arranged with the girl of Jnanamba's choice. However, the bride elopes and Jnanamba has a panic attack. After her neighbours humiliate her, Jnanamba promises to bring a daughter-in-law within 15 days.

Janaki's elder brother Yogi makes arrangements for his relocation to the US and plans to get Janaki married within 15 days. He emotionally blackmails Janaki into accepting for marriage. Yogi meets Jnanamba and family through a matchmaker and learns that Jnanamba need a partially educated daughter-in-law. To ensure Janaki's settlement, Yogi lies about Janaki's education levels and get her married to Rama. Janaki has to accept her role as an ideal daughter-in-law of the family. After her marriage, her co-sister Mallika gets jealous of her and tries to get her humiliated by Jnanamba but fails. Mallika also gets suspicious of Janaki when her suitcase has several IPS books present in it. Mallika tries to expose Janaki but fails again. Days later, Jnanamba and family visit a friend's house for a function. There, Jnanamba's friend Vyjanthi sees Janaki's way of speaking and gets suspicious about Janaki's education. She tells this to Jnanamba but Jnanamba brushes off Vyjanthi's statement and says that she would have never got her son married to an educated girl, Janaki accidentally overhears this and starts to feel angry and upset. Jnanamba also gets humiliated for not getting a grandson. She vows to get a grandson from Janaki in a year.

During the function, as there is nobody present in the house, Mallika, takes chance and goes for a movie with her friends. Meanwhile, during this time, a few robbers rob the house. When she returns, she is shocked to find the home robbed. Scared of Jnanamba's ire, Mallika cleans the house with some of the family members and makes Jnanamba believe that everything was fine and nothing of the unusual had happened. However, Jnanamba gets suspicious about her family's behavior and begins to enquire Mallika. Jnanamba finds the truth and asks Mallika to leave the house but upon her plea, Jnanamba asks Mallika's parents to visit the house. Mallika's parents came to the house but asked Jnanmba to forgive Mallika. Then, Janaki asks Jnanamba to forgive Mallika. Jnanamba accepts her request on a condition. The condition is that incase Mallika does any mistake once again, it will be Janaki leaving the house. Janaki convinces Jnanamba to forgive Mallika and she accepts under one condition that Janaki should leave the house if Mallika makes a mistake. On the other hand, Janaki, who had learnt that Jnanamba assumed her to be partially uneducated confronts Yogi for lying and decides to say reveal truth to her in-laws. However, she remains quiet after high tensions in family due to Mallika's act.

Later, Janaki begins to impress her in-laws and also learns to cook from Rama. Desperate about a grandson, Jnanamba arranges a pooja(ritual) and forbids the family from eating till evening. A hungry Mallika ignores the rules and Jnanamba finds about it. She asks Janaki to leave the house. However, Rama solves the issue impressing Janaki. Jnanamba too forgives Janaki and asks her to cook for the family. Though she does not know to cook, she succeeds by watching a cooking video. Mallika spoils the food which makes it extremely spicy and salty. Before Jnananmba could eat it, Rama realizes the mistake and saves Janaki.

Jnanamba wants a grandson and leaves for a temple to let Rama and Janaki be alone. Janaki regrets hiding about her education after seeing how her family loves and respects her. She reveals the truth to Rama, who is shattered and angry at first but later recognizes Janaki's innocence in Yogi's betrayal. He hides the truth when Janaki tries to confess this to Jnanamba. Janaki enrolls in a civils coaching academy under pretext of learning to bake cakes for the development of their food shop. However, Jnanamba learns of Janaki's degree and struggles between her ego and son's life. She asks her mother-in-law Myravathi, a suggestion about whether to let Janaki be the daughter-in-law of family or ask her to leave. Influenced by Mallika's plans, Myravathi asks Jnanamba to banish Janaki but the former forgives her recognizing her sincerity under one condition that she should not study further. Meanwhile, Akhil, Jnanamba's younger son takes an interest and music and fails in his degree leaving Jnanamba agitated and she blames Janaki since the latter bought a guitar for Akhil. However, dispute gets settled and Jnanamba tries looking for grooms for her daughter Vennela. The latter is in love with Dileep. Kanna Babu, Janaki's former obsessive lover who holds a grudge against her family films Vennela and Dileep's conversation and blackmails her. Learning of this, Mallika tries to settle the dispute to earn Vennela's respect and to despise Janaki but the latter saves Mallika in turn from Kanna Babu, who charges Janaki with a case and gets her arrested. Myravathi asks Jnanamba to banish Janaki since the latter deprived the family of its reputation. Heartbroken, Janaki leaves despite Rama's plea. Meanwhile, Janaki's bus meets with an accident and the family presumes her to be dead. However, she turns out to be alive and Jnanamba welcomes her home.

Jnanamba wants her daughter Vennela to be married while Nikhil, her younger son fails in his examinations. Janaki requests Jnanamba to give Nikhil, a last chance while Vennela is revealed to be in love with Dilip. Janaki and Rama decides to have them married after Jnanamba fixes her marriage with someone else and they try to commit suicide. Janaki convinces the groom's family to stop the marriage and pretends that Dilip is her relative to have his marriage fixed to Vennela. She succeeds and the family celebrate Jnanamba and Govindharaju's 30th wedding anniversary. Mallika recruits Leelavathi, a talkative woman of the street to insult Jnanamba for not having grandchildren. Next day, Jnanamba assumes that Janaki is pregnant and distributes sweets without talking with her landing Janaki and Rama in trouble. However, the dispute gets settled and everyone learns the truth. Now, Mallika wants to spoil Dilip and Vennela's marriage as she wants Vennela to marry her younger brother. She finds it out and exposes Vennela and Dilip's love affair on the wedding day leading Jnanamba to expel Janaki and Rama. However, Myravathi realizes their responsibility towards Vennela.But Rama gets devastated to stay away with her mother and gets worried in front of janaki many times,so she arranges a hut   in the garden of jnanmba's house. Mallika spoils jnanamba's mind and provokes her against janaki.Jnananamba starts hating Janaki by thinking that she was separating her son from her.Mallika also provokes yogi, janaki's brother against gnanamba saying that jnanamba doing domestic violence on his sister Janaki for which he files a domestic violence case in the police station eventually jnanamba gets arrested. Ramachandra gets shocked to learn about his mother arrest and suspects janaki leaving her in tears.After janaki compromises his brother jnanamba comes out of jail.Later yogi apologizes jnanamba for filing the case and celebrates his son cradle ceremony. 

Later Kannababu pressures Ramachandra to repay his debt (which he made for janaki's education unaware of Jnanamba and his family) orelse he will be owning their sweet shop.Meanwhile, Ramachandra and janaki gets tensed as Kannababu repeatedly blackmails them about the same thing. Janaki learns about the National chef competition and encourages rama chandra to participate in that competition, so that he can repay kannababu's debt by the cash prize and also he can shut the mouths who insults him as an illiterate cook.Ramachandra and Janaki goes to Jnanamba and asks  her permission to the chef competition but Jnanamba rejects as she fears a lot as Ramachandra do not have much cooking knowledge and he cannot bear the sorrow if he lost the competition. By being jealous Mallika also tries to stop them from going the competition but Govindaraju convinces Jnanamba and she allows them to participate in the National chef competition.Sunandha and his son Kannababu knows about the same and goes to the place of competition and creates many hurdles for him.But Ramachandra faces all the hurdles caused by them and becomes the winner of the national chef competition.
After finishing all the computation the Rama will won the match but in that result some confusion will arrive .

Cast

Main characters
 Priyanka Jain as Janaki: Rama's wife; Yogi's younger sister; Shiva Prasad and Aravindha's daughter; Jnanamba and Govindharaju's eldest daughter-in-law (2021-present)
 Amardeep Chowdhary as Ramachandra "Rama": Janaki's husband; Vishnu, Akhil and Vennela's eldest brother; Jnanamba and Govindharaju's eldest son; Shiva Prasad and Aravindha's son-in-law (2021-present)
 Raasi as Jnana Prasunamba "Jnanamba": Govindharaju's wife; Rama, Vishnu, Akhil and Vennela's mother; Janaki and Mallika's mother-in-law; Myravathi's daughter-in-law (2021-present)

Recurring
 Anil Allam as Govindharaju: Jnanamba's husband; Rama, Vishnu, Akhil and Vennela's father; Janaki and Mallika's father-in-law; Myravathi's son 
 Vishnu Priya as Mallika: Vishnu's wife; Jnanamba and Govindharaju's second daughter-in-law
 Surya as Yogi: Janaki's elder brother; Urmila's husband; Shiva Prasad and Aravindha's son 
 Sweth as Vishnu: Mallika's husband; Jnanamba and Govindharaju's second eldest son; Rama's younger brother; Akhil and Vennela's elder brother 
 Madhu Krishnan as Urmila: Yogi's wife; Shiva Prasad and Aravindha's daughter-in-law (2021-present)
 Nikhil as Akhil: Rama and Vishnu's younger brother; Vennela's elder brother; Jnanamba and Govindharaju's youngest son
 Nehal Gangavath as Vennela: Rama, Vishnu and Akhil's younger sister; Jnanamba and Govindharaju's only daughter 
 Nalini as Myravathi: Rama, Vishnu, Akhil and Vennela's paternal grandmother; Govindharaju's mother; Jnanamba's mother-in-law 
 Anu Manasa as Sunandha: Kanna Babu's mother; Jnanamba's rival 
 Sai Kiran as Kanna Babu: Sunandha's son
 Ramya as Chikitha: Jnanamba's house help; Rajini's elder sister
 Mahathi as Vyjayanthi: Jnanamba's friend
 Master Chakri as Rajinikanth "Rajini": Chikitha's brother
 Padmavathi Addanki as Neelavathi: Jnanamba's neighbour 
 C H Krishnaveni as Mallika's paternal grandmother

Cameo
 Prabha as herself; judge for Cookery competition in which Rama participates (2022-present)
 Sanjay Thumma as himself; judge for Cookery competition in which Rama participates (2022-present)
 Ariana Glory as herself; judge for Cookery competition in which Rama participates (2022-present)
 Mahesh as himself; judge for Cookery competition in which Rama participates (2022-present)
 Priyanka Singh as herself; judge for Cookery competition in which Rama participates (2022-present)
 Chitti Babu as Kanna Rao: matchmaker between Rama and Janaki (2021)
 Raja Ravindra as Shiva Prasad: Janaki and Yogi's father; Aravindha's husband; Rama and Urmila's father-in-law (Dead) (2021)
 Sheela Singh as Aravindha: Janaki and Yogi's father; Shiva Prasad's wife; Rama and Urmila's mother-in-law (Dead) (2021)
 Manjula Paritala as Inspector Vaishnavi, Janaki's role model in her childhood (2021) 
 Sireesha Vallabhaneni as Inspector Vidya, Guest for Janaki and Ramachandra's marriage (2021)
 Shanthi Reddy as Chief Guest on Janaki's Degree convocation. (2021)
 Naga Manikanta as Abhi, Janaki's classmate (2021)
 Ajay Kiran as Madhan, Mallika's brother (2021)
 Suhasini as Rukmini (reprised her role from Devatha - Anubandhala Alayam) (2022)

Reception
During its premiere week, the series was the fourth most watched Telugu GEC. The following week it dropped to fifth position and continued to maintain it mostly the following weeks.

References

External links
 Janaki Kalaganaledu on Hotstar

Indian television series
Indian television soap operas
Serial drama television series
2021 Indian television series debuts
Indian drama television series
Star Maa original programming
Television shows set in Andhra Pradesh